Metals is the fourth studio album by Canadian singer-songwriter Feist. It was released on September 30, 2011 in Ireland, Austria, Switzerland, Germany, Sweden and Belgium; October 3, 2011 in the United Kingdom; and October 4, 2011 in the United States and Canada. The first single from the album is "How Come You Never Go There", which was released on August 12, 2011. The album was supported by a world tour which started in Amsterdam, Netherlands on October 15, 2011 and finished on October 20, 2012 in Latin America.

Metals debuted on the US Billboard 200 at number 7, and sold 38,000 copies in its first week. It earned Feist's best sales week and it was her first top 10 album to chart in the US. The album received acclaim from critics.

Promotion
Promotion for the album began with short videos which feature snippets of tracks and the making of the album. They were posted on her website and other social networking sites since July 21, 2011. Four days after, she officially announced the release of Metals. Artwork for the album was revealed on August 2, 2011; previously, fans were given the opportunity to select the color design for the album cover on Facebook.

Writing and recording
After touring for her previous album, The Reminder, Feist was "emotionally deaf". She stopped playing music for two years, saying that she "wasn't curious anymore". In 2010, she went to the studio in Paris where she had recorded The Reminder. After coming back from Paris six months later, she wrote most of the album.  For recording Metals, Feist went to Big Sur with the lyrics almost completed and set up an ad hoc recording studio. Metals was recorded in Toronto and Big Sur, with collaborators including Chilly Gonzales, Mocky, Brian LeBarton, Dean Stone, and producer Valgeir Sigurðsson. They began recording the album in January 2011. She said of the recording process that "I allowed for mistakes more than I ever have, which end up not being mistakes when you open things up and make room for them."

The album's title was partially inspired by Charles C. Mann's non-fiction book 1491: New Revelations of the Americas Before Columbus, where it describes the Aztecs' and conquistadors' differing ideas about precious metals such as gold.

Composition
For the album, Feist aimed for a sound she described as "modern ancient", mixing old and new instruments. She stated that the album had "more chaos and movement and noise than I've had before." The music of Metals is influenced by genres such as jazz and the blues, and contains elements of folk. The lyrics of Metals contain a lot of "nature imagery", as Feist was fascinated by the weather since "it makes you feel so minute." They also contemplate topics such as dying love, mortality and solitude. She also pointed to "Sealion" from The Reminder and said that it "grandfathered some of the concepts in Metals". There are many minor chords and open fifths on Metals, as well as a lot of voices sung in unison. The songs "How Come You Never Go There" and "Anti-Pioneer" are ballads, the latter she had worked on for ten years.

Reception

Metals debuted at number seven on the Billboard 200, selling about 38,000 copies. It was Feist's best ever sales week, and was her first appearance on the top 10 of the Billboard 200. At Metacritic, a website which assigns a normalised rating out of 100 to reviews from mainstream critics, the album received a score of 81, based on 39 reviews, indicating "universal acclaim".

Spin gave "Metals" a score of 7/10, writing "Taken individually, each song is as sturdy as oak -- the guitars have a magnesium shimmer, and every instrument seems bathed in its own spotlight, especially Feist's vocals, which feel like they're being whispered directly into your ear." In a positive review, Lindsay Zoladz of Pitchfork Media gave the album a 7.7 out of 10. She noted that there was no "1234" on the album, which is the reason that "it feels like such a refreshing and slyly badass statement of artistic integrity" and also that "it doesn't reach The Reminder's heights." Andrew Leahey of AllMusic wrote that "Feist's days as a provider of hip, trendy TV jingles may be over", and that "Metals does its best work at a slower speed".

Elysa Gardner of USA Today gave the album 2.5 stars out of 4, and named "The Bad in Each Other" and "Caught a Long Wind" as the highlights of the album. A mixed review from Slant Magazine criticized most of the album for not having a "real spark to it" and stated that "Metals is too dull for [Feist] to overcome".

The album has received a number of accolades. The New York Times and The Globe and Mail named Metals as the best album of 2011. Uncut and Paste named it the 17th and 29th best album of 2011, respectively. Q named it the 29th best album of 2011. Feist was nominated for Best International Female Artist at the 2012 BRIT Awards for Metals.

The album was named as a longlisted nominee for the 2012 Polaris Music Prize on June 14, 2012. The album won the Polaris Music Prize making her the first female artist to win the award and, as of September 25, 2012, it has sold 141,000 copies in the U.S. As of January 2012 UK sales stand at 40,000 copies according to The Guardian.

Track listing

Personnel

Band
Leslie Feist – guitars, organ, piano
Mocky – drums, acoustic and electric bass, piano
Chilly Gonzales – piano, organ, electric bass, drums
Brian LeBarton – organs, synths, piano, electric bass, drums
Dean Stone – drums, percussion

Additional musicians
Colin Stetson – bass, baritone and tenor saxophones, bass and tenor clarinets, French horn, flute, trumpet
Evan Cranley – euphonium, trombone
Bry Webb – voice 
Irene Sazer – violin, group vocals
Alisa Rose – violin, group vocals
Dina Maccabee – viola, group vocals
Jessica Ivry – cello, group vocals

Technical
Robbie Lackritz – engineering, mixing 
Lionel Darenne – engineering, mixing 
Renaud Letang – mixing 
Howie Beck – mixing 
Thomas Moulin – mix assistance
Mandy Parnell – mastering
Philip Shaw Bova – additional mastering
Management – Chip Sutherland and Robbie Lackritz

Arrangement
Feist – arrangement, string and horn arrangements
Mocky – arrangement, string and horn arrangements
Chilly Gonzales – arrangement, string and horn arrangements
Colin Stetson – additional horn arrangements
Evan Cranley – additional horn arrangements
Valgeir Sigurðsson – additional horn arrangements

Design
Jannie McInnes – creative direction
Mary Rozzi – photography
Heather Goodchild – typography, print design
Graydon Sheppard – graphic design, with:
Robyn Kotyk
Petra Cuschierl
Sammy Rawal
Rory Them Finest
Dean Conger/National Geographic Stock – additional photography
Sammy Rawal – additional photography

Charts

Certifications and sales

Tour
Metals Tour ''

Opening act
Chilly Gonzales (select dates)
M. Ward (select dates)
Timber Timbre (select dates)
Bon Iver (select dates)
The Low Anthem (select dates)

Release history

References

External links

The Bad in Each Other music video by Martin de Thurah
Anti-Pioneer music video by Martin de Thurah

2011 albums
Feist (singer) albums
Interscope Records albums
Polaris Music Prize-winning albums
Polydor Records albums
Juno Award for Adult Alternative Album of the Year albums
Albums produced by Valgeir Sigurðsson